The Tampa Bay Buccaneers joined the National Football League (NFL) in 1976 with the Seattle Seahawks.

Every April, each NFL franchise adds new players to its roster through a collegiate draft at the "NFL Annual Player Selection Meeting", more commonly known as the NFL Draft. Teams are ranked in reverse order based on the previous season's record, with the team with the worst record having the first selection. The two exceptions to this order are made for teams that appeared in the previous season's Super Bowl; the Super Bowl champion is the last team to select and the Super Bowl runner up selects right before them. This order is subject to teams trading away selections to other teams for different selections, players, cash or a combination thereof. Thus, it is common for a team's actual draft pick to differ from their assigned draft pick, or for a team to have multiple or no draft picks the first round due to trades.

The Buccaneers have had the first overall pick on six occasions. Twice in 1978 and 1984, they traded it away. Three eventual Hall of Famers were selected by the Buccaneers. The Buccaneers' first selection as an NFL team was Lee Roy Selmon, a defensive lineman from Oklahoma. The team's most-recent first-round selection was Joe Tryon-Shoyinka, an outside linebacker from the University of Washington.

Key

Player selections

Footnotes

The Buccaneers traded their first overall pick to the Houston Oilers for Jimmie Giles, this pick and a second-round pick in this draft and the Oilers third and fifth-round picks in the 1979 draft.
The Buccaneers traded the 4th overall selection to Chicago for Wally Chambers.
The Buccaneers traded their first-round pick to the Chicago Bears for their 1982 second-round pick.
The Buccaneers traded their first-round pick to the Cincinnati Bengals in 1983 for Jack Thompson.
Jackson refused to play for the Buccaneers, and instead played baseball for the Kansas City Royals. In 1987, he was drafted by the Los Angeles Raiders and played both professional sports to an All-Pro level.
The Buccaneers traded away their second overall pick to the Indianapolis Colts for Chris Chandler.
The Buccaneers traded their seventh overall pick to the Eagles for this pick and two second-round picks.
The Buccaneers acquired this pick from the Dallas Cowboys for two second-round picks.
The additional first-round pick was acquired from the Indianapolis Colts for Craig Erickson.

The Buccaneers originally traded their 8th overall pick to the Jets to move up two picks. They then traded that pick to the Seattle Seahawks for this pick and a third-round pick.
This pick was acquired from the San Diego Chargers in return for a second-round pick the previous year.
The Buccaneers traded their first-round pick to Raiders for two second-round picks.
The Buccaneers gained an additional first-round pick from the San Diego Chargers as a result of a draft-day deal in 1998.
The Buccaneers traded their first-pick and one they acquired from the Chargers in 1998, to the New York Jets for Keyshawn Johnson.
The Buccaneers had the 21st overall selection but made a draft-day deal with the Buffalo Bills to move up seven picks.
The Buccaneers traded linebacker Hugh Green to the Miami Dolphins for the first (#25 overall pick)  and second-round picks.
The Buccaneers traded their 2002 and 2003 first-round picks to the Oakland Raiders as part of a trade for Jon Gruden.

References
General

 
 

Specific

Tampa Bay Buccaneers

first-round draft picks